is an island in the Pacific Ocean. It is part of the Kerama Islands group and administered as the village of Zamami in Shimajiri District, Okinawa Prefecture, Japan. Zamami Island is 24 kilometers in circumference. The island has 3 settlements, which are Zamami, Ama, and Asa.

Attractions
Furuzamami Beach. It was ranked 4th in Japan in the “Travelers Choice World's Best Beach 2016” announced by Trip Advisor in 2016.
Ama Beach
Furuzamami Kaizuka
Tower of peace
Kerama Marine Culture Museum
Marilyn statue

Observation
Takatsuki mountain park
Takatsukiyama Observatory-Altitude 131m
Observatory 1-Overlooking the calm Anogoura Bay
Nase no Saki Observatory
Inasaki Observatory (Nanzachi no Saki)
Chishi Observatory
Kaminohama Observatory

References

Islands of Okinawa Prefecture
Kerama Islands